William W. Spearman (born February 27, 1958) is an American Democratic Party politician from Camden, who has represented the 5th Legislative District in the New Jersey General Assembly since taking office on June 30, 2018.

Raised in Camden, New Jersey, Spearman graduated from Woodrow Wilson High School and Rutgers University before attending Temple University, where he earned an M.B.A.

New Jersey Assembly 
Before taking office in the Assembly in June 2018, Spearman had served on the Camden city council from 2006 to 2011 and had been employed for a decade with the South Jersey Transportation Authority, serving for five years as the agency's ethics liaison officer. He was chosen by the county Democratic Party committee on June 27, 2018  to succeed Arthur Barclay, who had resigned from office earlier that month after being arrested for assault.

Committees 
Committee assignments for the current session are:
Law and Public Safety, Chair
Agriculture and Food Security, Vice-chair
Special Committee on Infrastructure and Natural Resources
Transportation and Independent Authorities

District 5 
Each of the 40 districts in the New Jersey Legislature has one representative in the New Jersey Senate and two members in the New Jersey General Assembly. The representatives from the 5th District for the 2022—2023 Legislative Session are:
Senator Nilsa Cruz-Perez  (D)
Assemblyman Bill Moen  (D)
Assemblyman William Spearman  (D)

Electoral history

Assembly

References

External links
Legislative webpage

1958 births
African-American state legislators in New Jersey
Living people
Democratic Party members of the New Jersey General Assembly
New Jersey city council members
21st-century American politicians
Politicians from Camden, New Jersey
Rutgers University alumni
Temple University alumni
Woodrow Wilson High School (New Jersey) alumni